Farhad Ahmed Kanchan is a Bangladesh Nationalist Party politician and the former Member of Parliament of Mymensingh-22.

Career
Kanchan was elected to parliament from Mymensingh-22 as a Bangladesh Nationalist Party candidate in 1979.

References

Bangladesh Nationalist Party politicians
Living people
2nd Jatiya Sangsad members
Year of birth missing (living people)